Khine Htoo (also spelt Khaing Htoo, 28 January 1956 – 9 August 2017) was a prominent Burmese singer, known for numerous hit songs, including "Sagaing Road", "Khitta" , "The Last Dream", and "Inzali".

Early life and education 
Khine Htoo was born on 28 January 1956, in Rangoon, Burma, to Tha Hto, a professor at the Yangon University of Economics, and his wife, Tin Myint Myint. He was the second eldest of three children.

Khine Htoo was first married to May Kyaw Khaing, a physician. The two separated following the 8888 Uprising, when his wife, involved in political activities, fled to the Thai-Burmese border. Following that, he wed Mi Gai(T Hawng Naw), an ethnic Kachin. The two have a son, Gum San Laphai(Seng Lin Htoo).His third marriage was with Saw Nwe Nwe Htun.At that time of his death, left by his only son,Gum San Lahpai(Seng Lin Htoo),who now lives in Sweden.

Death 
On 31 July 2017, Khine Htoo was admitted to Yangon General Hospital for hematemesis, and also showed symptoms of jaundice. HIs condition did not improve, so he was flown to Samitivej Hospital in Bangkok for further treatment. There, he was diagnosed with an advanced form of pancreatic cancer. Khine Htoo was flown back to Yangon on 8 August, and died of pancreatic cancer at the Parami Hospital in Yangon, Myanmar on 9 August 2017, around 3:24 pm.

Discography

Solo albums

See also 
 Music of Myanmar

References 

1956 births
2017 deaths
21st-century Burmese male singers
20th-century Burmese male singers